Lincare Holdings Inc. (Lincare) is a wholly owned subsidiary of Linde PLC, operating as a holding company, headquartered in Clearwater, FL. Lincare, through its subsidiaries, provides oxygen, nebulizer, sleep apnea, home INR testing, ventilator and enteral therapy as well as healthcare services and other respiratory therapy services to patients in the home. The company also provides home-use medical equipment, including wheelchairs, walkers, and hospital beds. Lincare operates from over 700 locations in 49 states, and employs over 11,000 people nationwide, including 1,300 licensed clinicians. 

In July 2012, Linde PLC, a German-based company that specializes industrial gases, announced it would acquire Lincare for $4.6 billion.

History 
Linde and Lincare share historical ties; Lincare originated from Linde Air Products in the early 20th century under the U.S. subsidiary business of the Linde Group.

In 1879, Carl von Linde founds the Gesellschaft für Linde's Eismaschinen in Wiesbaden, Germany, to sell mechanical refrigeration systems for the brewing and food industries.

In 1907, Carl von Linde traveled to the United States to establish the Linde Air Products in Buffalo, NY, as a subsidiary of Linde.  

In 1917, due to the First World War, Linde lost its U.S. subsidiary from expropriation. Union Carbide Corporation acquired Linde’s U.S. business, formally combining Linde Air Products as a subsidiary of Union Carbide.

In 1972, the precursor to Lincare, Linde Homecare Medical Systems was formed, as a unit in Union Carbide’s industrial gasses division.

In 1984, Union Carbide faced financial issues from a major liability lawsuit in Bhopal, India, due to a chemical plant explosion that killed 3,000 people and left 50,000 more with life-long injuries. As a result of the lawsuit in India, and a hostile takeover attempt from GAF Corporation, Union Carbide bought back 55 percent of its stock, and in the process went $3 billion into debt. To alleviate the debt, Union Carbide sold off some of its holdings, including spinning off Linde Homecare Medical Systems into Lincare Inc in 1987.

In 1990, Union Carbide sold its remaining 50 percent equity stake in Lincare Inc., to a group of investors and Lincare executives, who renamed the company Lincare Holdings.

In 1992, the partner owners of Lincare Holdings took the company public on the NASDAQ, and completed its initial public offering, raising $50 million.

Over the next 18 years, Lincare Holdings became the largest respiratory therapy provider in the United States, serving more than 800,000 patients in 48 states. Lincare’s success was in part due to its aggressive acquisition strategy in the late 1990s through the early 2000s, where it purchased operating assets of 33 local and regional competitors plus the common stock of several other companies.

In July 2012, The Linde Group acquired Lincare Holdings for $4.6 billion. Lincare was Linde’s largest acquisition since it bought BOC Group Ltd. In 2006. By acquiring Lincare, Linde doubled sales in its North American Gases Division, and officially brought Lincare back into the Linde family.

References 

Companies based in Clearwater, Florida
Companies formerly listed on the Nasdaq